Darkest Hour may refer to:

 "The Darkest Hour", a phrase used to describe the early period of World War II

Film and television 
 The Darkest Hour (1919 film), a film featuring Louis Wolheim
 The Darkest Hour (film), a 2011 science fiction film
 Darkest Hour (film), a 2017 film starring Gary Oldman as Winston Churchill

Literature 
 Darkest Hour (Andrews novel), a 1993 novel by V. C. Andrews
 Darkest Hour (Cabot novel), a 2001 novel by Meg Cabot
 The Darkest Hour (novel), a Warriors novel by Erin Hunter
 Spider-Man: The Darkest Hours, a novel by Jim Butcher

Music 
 Darkest Hour (band), an American death metal band
 Darkest Hour (album), a 2014 album by Darkest Hour
 "Darkest Hours", a 2010 song by Stratovarius
 Darkest Hour, an EP by Charlotte Martin
 "Darkest Hour", a song by Arlo Guthrie from Amigo

Video games 
 Darkest Hour: Europe '44-'45, a 2008 modification of the computer game Red Orchestra: Ostfront 41-45
 Darkest Hour: A Hearts of Iron Game, a 2011 computer game

See also 
 
 The Dark Hour (disambiguation)